Pterotopteryx nigrifasciata is a moth of the family Alucitidae. It was described by Bong-Kyu Byun and Kyu-Tek Park in 2007. It is found in Ninh Bình Province, Vietnam.

References

Moths described in 2007
Alucitidae